Hamilton Fish II (June 27, 1873 - June 24, 1898) was a wealthy New Yorker who was a member of a prominent Fish family.  He joined the United States Army's 1st United States Volunteer Cavalry Regiment, the Rough Riders, during the Spanish–American War.  Fish attained the rank of sergeant, and died after he was shot during the Battle of Las Guasimas.

Biography
Fish was son of diplomat and banker Nicholas Fish and Clemence Smith (Bryce) Fish.  He was the nephew of namesake Hamilton Fish II, the former speaker of the New York State Assembly, and grandson of the 26th United States Secretary of State, Hamilton Fish.  Fish attended Columbia University as a member of the class of 1895 and was a member of St. Anthony Hall.  To prepare for a career as a railroad executive, he was employed through family connections by the Denver and Rio Grande Western Railroad in Salt Lake City, where he worked in the maintenance and repair shops, as a brakeman, and in other blue collar positions within the company.

Fish was a member of "L" troop commanded by Captain Allyn K. Capron Jr.  He was not the only soldier from a prominent family in the unit: "... To this rugged crew, Roosevelt added some 50 men with backgrounds closer to his own: Ivy Leaguers from wealthy Eastern families. In citing their qualifications for active duty, Roosevelt touted their athletic accomplishments. Dudley Dean was "perhaps the best quarterback who ever played on a Harvard 11." Bob Wrenn was "the champion tennis player of America." Other Easterners included "Waller, the high jumper; Craig Wadsworth, the steeplechase rider; Joe Stephens, the crack polo player; and Hamilton Fish, the ex-captain of the Columbia crew."

He was one of the first Americans killed in the Battle of Las Guasimas, near Santiago, Cuba, on June 24, 1898. He died of a gunshot just near the heart and survived less than a minute, according to a Rough Rider, trooper Ed Culver, who was wounded by the same bullet.

Movies
Hamilton Fish was played by Holt McCallany in the 1997 TV movie Rough Riders.

References

General References

External links
 Picture of Sgt. Fish in account of battle by fellow officer Meyer Hurwitz
 National Archives account @ NARA.gov
 Additional narrative account
 Troop Muster with cause of death
 Detailed account of the battle citing Fish's death
 Additional account of the battle citing Fish's death at
 IMDB Database Rough Riders 1997

1873 births
1898 deaths
Hamilton II
Military personnel from New York City
Rough Riders
Columbia University alumni
People from Garrison, New York
American military personnel killed in the Spanish–American War